Prostaglandin-I synthase also known as prostaglandin I2 (prostacyclin) synthase (PTGIS) or CYP8A1 is an enzyme involved in prostanoid biosynthesis that in humans is encoded by the PTGIS gene. This enzyme belongs to the family of cytochrome P450 isomerases.

Function 

This gene encodes a member of the cytochrome P450 superfamily of enzymes. The cytochrome P450 proteins are monooxygenases which catalyze many reactions involved in drug metabolism and synthesis of cholesterol, steroids and other lipids. However, this protein is considered a member of the cytochrome P450 superfamily on the basis of sequence similarity rather than functional similarity. This endoplasmic reticulum membrane protein catalyzes the conversion of prostaglandin H2 to prostacyclin (prostaglandin I2), a potent vasodilator and inhibitor of platelet aggregation. An imbalance of prostacyclin and its physiological antagonist thromboxane A2 contribute to the development of myocardial infarction, stroke, and atherosclerosis.

Unlike most P450 enzymes, PGIS does not require molecular oxygen (O2).  Instead it uses its heme cofactor to catalyze the isomerization of prostaglandin H2 to prostacyclin.  Prostaglandin H2 is produced by cyclooxygenase in the first committed step of prostaglandin biosynthesis.

Nomenclature 

The systematic name of this enzyme class is (5Z,13E)-(15S)-9alpha,11alpha-epidioxy-15-hydroxyprosta-5,13-dienoate 6-isomerase. Other names in common use include prostacyclin synthase, prostacyclin synthetase, prostagladin I2 synthetase, PGI2 synthase, PGIS, PTGIS, and PGI2 synthetase.

Pathways

See also
 Prostanoid

References

Further reading

External links
 

EC 5.3.99
Heme enzymes
Enzymes of known structure